The 1972 WANFL season was the 88th season of the various incarnations of the Western Australian National Football League. It saw East Perth, after five Grand Final losses in six seasons and a frustrating seven since their last premiership in 1959, break the drought against a Claremont team that had achieved its first minor premiership since Johnny Leonard’s days, despite kicking into the wind after winning the toss.

The two clubs established their supremacy from early in the season, and the battle for the last place in the four was won by reigning premiers West Perth despite losing eight of their last ten matches.

1971 preliminary finalists East Fremantle, equal favourites for the premiership with Claremont in the pre-season were affected by form lapses and controversial behaviour by coach Alan Joyce, who in June refused to allow Old Easts players selected in the state team to train there rather than at East Fremantle Oval. A game behind the Cardinals after eleven matches, the blue and whites could themselves win only thrice, whilst South Fremantle in a rebuilding phase under Mal Atwell and without key players Hassa Mann, Graham Scott and Len Clark lost nine on end but did uncover players like Bruce Monteath who would help them become a WA(N)FL power between 1975 and 1983.

An unfancied but revitalised Perth under captain-coach Barry Cable were the Tigers’ and Royals’ nearest rival but could not win any of seven matches against them, whilst Subiaco, fancied before the season and showing an innovative "Think Subi" campaign but affected by off-field disputes involving the sacking of returning veteran Cam Blakemore, were last or second-last for eight rounds before a five-game winning streak had them theoretically in contention for the four with two rounds to play.

Home-and-away season

Round 1 (Easter weekend)

Round 2

Round 3

Round 4

Round 5

Round 6

Round 7

Round 8

Round 9

Round 10 (Foundation Day)

Round 11

Round 12

Round 13

Round 14

Round 15

Round 16

Round 17

Round 18

Round 19

Round 20

Round 21

Ladder

Finals

First semi-final

Second semi-final

Preliminary final

Grand Final

Notes
This policy was made illegal in 1973 when a ‘centre diamond’ (later the current centre square) was introduced, within with no team could place more than four players during a centre bounce.

References

External links
Official WAFL website
Western Australian National Football League (WANFL), 1972

West Australian Football League seasons
WANFL